Cysmethynil is a chemical compound that is reported to inhibit Icmt, a protein that methylates a Ras protein, which then triggers uncontrolled cell growth. If Icmt no longer activates Ras, cell growth and proliferatation remains under normal control. As such, this small molecule has been investigated as a treatment for cancer. In animal models containing multiple human tumor growths, treatment with cysmethynil causes autophagy in the cell and results in cell death and reduced tumor burden.  In prostate cancer cells, cysmethynil inhibits Icmt such that the cell is stuck in the G1 phase, and this leads to the autophagic cell death.

References
2. "Cysmethynil : A New Anti-Cancer Compound That Blocks the Icmt Protein Activation." Cysmethynil : A New Anti-Cancer Compound That Blocks the Icmt Protein Activation. Proceedings of the National Academy of Sciences, 28 Mar. 2005. Web. 19 Oct. 2012. <http://www.rxpgnews.com/cancer-therapy/Cysmethynil_A_New_Anti-Cancer_Compound_that_Blocks_782_782.shtml>.

5. "Arresting Prostate Cancer." The Journal of Biological Chemistry. American Society for Biochemistry and Molecular Biology, n.d. Web. 19 Oct. 2012. <http://www.jbc.org/content/283/27/e99932>.

6. "New Compound Blocks Growth of Cancer Cells." Inside- Duke University Medical Center and Health System. N.p., 04 Apr. 2005. Web. 20 Oct. 2012. <http://inside.duke.edu/article_print.php?id=9726>.

Acetamides
Tryptamines